Chumakov is a rural locality (a khutor) in Tryasinovskoye Rural Settlement, Serafimovichsky District, Volgograd Oblast, Russia. The population was 11 as of 2010. There are 2 streets.

Geography 
Chumakov is located 35 km northeast of Serafimovich (the district's administrative centre) by road. Perepolsky is the nearest rural locality.

References 

Rural localities in Serafimovichsky District